The Australia national cricket team toured South Africa from October 1966 to March 1967 and played a five-match Test series against the South African team. South Africa won the Test series 3–1. Australia were captained by Bob Simpson; South Africa by Peter van der Merwe.

Australian team

 Bob Simpson (NSW) (captain)
 Gordon Becker (WA)
 Ian Chappell (SA)
 Bob Cowper (Vic)
 Neil Hawke (SA)
 Jim Hubble (WA)
 Bill Lawry (Vic)
 Graham McKenzie (WA)
 Johnny Martin (NSW)
 Ian Redpath (Vic)
 David Renneberg (NSW)
 Keith Stackpole (Vic)
 Brian Taber (NSW)
 Grahame Thomas (NSW)
 Tom Veivers (Qld)
 Graeme Watson (Vic)

Doug Walters withdrew from the tour party when conscripted to two years of National Service training and was replaced by Watson.

Test series summary

First Test

Second Test

Third Test

Fourth Test

Fifth Test

References

External links
 Australia in South Africa, 1966-67 at Cricinfo
 Australia in South Africa 1966-67 at CricketArchive
 Test Cricket Tours - Australia to South Africa 1966-67 at Test Cricket Tours

1966 in Australian cricket
1966 in South African cricket
1967 in Australian cricket
1967 in South African cricket
International cricket competitions from 1960–61 to 1970
1966
South African cricket seasons from 1945–46 to 1969–70